RVB may stand for:
Ravensbourne railway station, London, National Rail station code
Red vs. Blue, a comic science fiction video series
Resonating valence bond theory, of superconductivity
Return Beam Vidicon, on the satellites Landsat 1-5
 Raymond Van Barneveld, Professional Darts player